In the military, a tour of duty is a period of operational time.

Art, entertainment, and media

Comics
 Tour of Duty (Judge Dredd story), a story in the Judge Dredd comic

Music
 Tour of Duty – Concert for the Troops, a 1999 concert in Dili for the Australian troops serving with INTERFET

Television
 Andy McNab's Tour of Duty, a British documentary series
 Tour of Duty (TV series), an American drama series
 Tour of Duty, better known as Breach of Conduct, an American TV film

Others
Tour of Duty (India), tour of duty in the Indian Army